Eugen Coca (born April 15, 1893 in Cureșnița, Soroca district – died January 9, 1954 in Chișinău) was a violinist and composer from the Republic of Moldova.

His works ranged from adaptations of folk songs and scores for film and theatre to compositions of symphonic, instrumental, chamber and choral music. He produced two symphonies and two symphonic poems, the most well known of which was the opera "Firebird" (Pasarea Măiastră), based on a popular legend.

There was a ten-year music school that took its name, which was later divided into two musical high schools: "Ciprian Porumbescu" high school and "Serghei Rahmaninov" high school.

Biography
Eugen Coca, violinist, conductor and composer, was born on 3 April 1893 (old style) in Cureșnița, Soroca District. From the early childhood, he was taught to play violin with his father, Costache Coca, a well-known musician (lăutar) from Soroca.

He became a violinist in the orchestra of the Drama Theater and in the folk music orchestra led by A. Poleacov (Chișinău, 1905–1908), while studying the violin with T. Grama and I. Finkel.

He was then a violinist in the Symphonic Orchestra of Eupatoria (1912–1913), in the orchestra of the Sibiriakov Opera Theater in Kostroma (1913–1914) and S. Zimin in Moscow (1914–1915).

From  1915 to 1917, he studied the violin under the guidance of professors Tall in Moscow and Malishevski in Odessa. He was a violist in the George Enescu Orchestra in Iași (1919–1925). He took the lessons of violin from I. Finkel (1924–1926) and of composition form  Gheorghi Iaţentkovski (1932) at Unirea Conservatoire in Chișinău.

Eugen Coca was a professor of harmony, theory and composition and conductor at the Music School in Cetatea Albă; a violinist at the Bucharest Radio Orchestra (1934–1940);  a conductor of the Symphony Orchestra of the Philharmonic in Chișinău (1944) and of the Radio Orchestra in Chișinău (1944).

Member of the Romanian Composers Society (1935); member of the Union of the Composers of the Republic of Moldova, the branch of the Union of the Composers of the  USSR (1940). He was awarded with the second honorable mention for the symphonic painting (1936) and with the first honorable mention for the Romanian Capricious (1937)  and with the Award for the "George Enescu" composition.  
He had pupils like B. Podgurschi (violinist). He collaborated with: I. Dailis, N. Cerenesa, T. Iaţkovski, J. Bobescu, G. Enescu, L. Feldman, V. Jianu, Gh. Manole, C. Ţurcan, A. Theodorescu, N. Propişcean, V. Boz, M. Duda, P. Bacinin, etc.

References
Brezianu, Andrei, and Vlad Spânu. 2010. The A to Z of Moldova. The A to Z Guide Series 232. Lanham: Scarecrow Press. .

Romanian people of Moldovan descent
1893 births
1954 deaths
Moldovan violinists
Moldovan composers
20th-century violinists
20th-century composers
Male violinists
Male composers
20th-century male musicians
People from Soroca District
20th-century Moldovan musicians